Fetish art is art that depicts people in fetishistic situations such as S&M, domination/submission, bondage, transvestism and the like, sometimes in combination. It may simply depict a person dressed in fetish clothing, which could include undergarments, stockings, high heels, corsets, or boots.  A common fetish theme is a woman dressed as a dominatrix.

History 
Many of the 'classic' 1940s, 1950s and 1960s-era fetish artists such as Eric Stanton and Gene Bilbrew began their careers at Irving Klaw's Movie Star News company (later Nutrix), creating drawings for episodic illustrated bondage stories.

In 1946 fetish artist John Coutts (a.k.a. John Willie) founded Bizarre magazine. Bizarre was first published in Canada, then printed in the U.S., and was the inspiration for a number of new fetish magazines such as Bizarre Life. In 1957 English engineer John Sutcliffe founded Atomage magazine, which featured images of the rubber clothing he had made. Sutcliffe's work would inspire Dianna Rigg's leather-catsuit-wearing character in The Avengers, a TV show that "opened the floodgates for fetish-SM images".

In the 1970s and 1980s, fetish artists such as Robert Bishop were published extensively in bondage magazines. In more recent years, the annual SIGNY awards have been awarded to the bondage artists voted the best of that year.

Many artists working in the mainstream comic book industry have included fetishistic imagery in their work, usually as a shock tactic or to denote villainy or corruption. The boost that depictions of beautiful women in tight fetish outfits give to the sales of comics to a mostly teenage male comic-buying audience may also be a factor. In 1950s America comics with bondage or fetish themes began appearing. Around the same time, fetish artists influenced the cartoons of George Petty, Alberto Vargas and others, which featured in magazines like Playboy and Esquire. One example of fetish imagery in comics is the catsuit-wearing, whip-wielding Catwoman, who has been called, "an icon of fetish art".

Many S&M, leather and fetish artists have produced images depicting urine fetishism ("watersports"), including Domino, Touko Laaksonen ("Tom of Finland"), Matt, and Bill Schmeling ("The Hun").

Mainstream fine artists such as Allen Jones have included strong fetish elements in their work. An artist whose erotica transcends to mainstream collectors is found in the Shunga and Shibari style works of Hajime Sorayama. Taschen books included artist Hajime Sorayama, whom his peer artists call a cross between Norman Rockwell and Salvador Dalí, or an imaginative modern day Vargas. Sorayama's robotic diverse illustrative works are in the permanent collections of the New York City Museum of Modern Art (MoMA) and the Smithsonian Institution, as well as the fetish arts in the private World Erotic Art Museum Miami collection.

The works of contemporary fetish artists such as Roberto Baldazzini and Michael Manning are published by companies such as NBM Publishing and Taschen.

See also
 Erotic art
 Charles Guyette
 Eric Stanton
 Gene Bilbrew
 Irving Klaw
 John Willie
 List of fetish artists
 Damsel in distress
 Fetish model 
 Photomanipulation
 Yiff

References

Visual arts genres
Erotic art
Fetish subculture